Victoria Azarenka was the defending champion, but did not participate this year as she was on maternity leave.

Johanna Konta won the title, defeating Caroline Wozniacki in the final, 6–4, 6–3.

Seeds
All seeds received a bye into the second round.

Draw

Finals

Top half

Section 1

Section 2

Section 3

Section 4

Bottom half

Section 5

Section 6

Section 7

Section 8

Qualifying

Seeds

Qualifiers

Lucky losers

Draw

First qualifier

Second qualifier

Third qualifier

Fourth qualifier

Fifth qualifier

Sixth qualifier

Seventh qualifier

Eighth qualifier

Ninth qualifier

Tenth qualifier

Eleventh qualifier

Twelfth qualifier

References

External links 
 Main Draw
 Qualifying Draw

Women's Singles